Héctor Javier Vatter (born 14 December 1990) is an Argentine footballer.

He has played for Deportes La Serena or Everton.

Career
Vatter began playing football for Club Comunicaciones in Argentina. In June 2010, he went to Chile for an unsuccessful trial with Deportes Concepción. Rival Chilean Primera División B club Deportes La Serena signed him in July 2010.

References

External links
 Profile at BDFA 
 

1990 births
Living people
Argentine footballers
Argentine expatriate footballers
Deportes La Serena footballers
Rangers de Talca footballers
Expatriate footballers in Chile
Association football midfielders
Footballers from Buenos Aires